The cricoid cartilage , or simply cricoid (from the Greek krikoeides meaning "ring-shaped") or cricoid ring, is the only complete ring of cartilage around the trachea. It forms the back part of the voice box and functions as an attachment site for muscles, cartilages, and ligaments involved in opening and closing the airway and in producing speech.

Structure

The cricoid cartilage sits just inferior to the thyroid cartilage in the neck, at the level of the C6 vertebra, and is joined to it medially by the median cricothyroid ligament and postero-laterally by the cricothyroid joints. Inferior to it are the rings of cartilage around the trachea (which are not continuous – rather they are C-shaped with a gap posteriorly). The cricoid is joined to the first tracheal ring by the cricotracheal ligament, and this can be felt as a more yielding area between the firm thyroid cartilage and firmer cricoid.

It is also anatomically related to the thyroid gland; although the thyroid isthmus is inferior to it, the two lobes of the thyroid extend superiorly on each side of the cricoid as far as the thyroid cartilage above it.

The posterior part of the cricoid is slightly broader than the anterior and lateral parts, and is called the lamina, while the anterior part is the band; this may be the reason for the common comparison made between the cricoid and a signet ring. The slender ventral half, and the most caudal of the palpable laryngeal landmarks, is also referred to as the anterior cricoid arch.

Composition
It is made of hyaline cartilage, and so can become calcified or even ossified, particularly in old age.

Function
The function of the cricoid cartilage is to provide attachments for the cricothyroid muscle, posterior cricoarytenoid muscle and lateral cricoarytenoid muscle muscles, cartilages, and ligaments involved in opening and closing the airway and in speech production.

Clinical significance
When intubating a patient under general anesthesia prior to surgery, the anesthesiologist will press on the cricoid cartilage to compress the esophagus behind it so as to prevent gastric reflux from occurring: this is known as the Sellick manoeuvre. The Sellick Manoeuvre is typically only applied during a Rapid Sequence Induction (RSI), an induction technique reserved for those at high risk of aspiration.

The Sellick maneuver was considered the standard of care during rapid sequence induction for many years. The American Heart Association still advocates the use of cricoid pressure during resuscitation using a BVM, and during emergent oral endotracheal intubation.  However, recent research increasingly suggests that cricoid pressure may not be as advantageous as once thought. The initial article by Sellick was based on a small sample size at a time when high tidal volumes, head-down positioning, and barbiturate anesthesia were the rule.

Cricoid pressure may frequently be applied incorrectly. Cricoid pressure may frequently displace the esophagus laterally, instead of compressing it as described by Sellick.  Several studies demonstrate some degree of glottic compression  reduction in tidal volume and increase in peak pressures. Based on the current literature, the widespread recommendation that cricoid pressure be applied during every rapid sequence intubation is quickly falling out of favor.

Gastric reflux could cause aspiration if this is not done considering the general anesthesia can cause relaxation of the gastroesophageal sphincter allowing stomach contents to ascend through the esophagus into the trachea.

A medical procedure known as a cricoidectomy can be performed in which part or all of the cricoid cartilage is removed.  This is commonly done to relieve blockages within the trachea.

Fractures of the cricoid cartilage can be seen after manual strangulation also known as throttling.

Additional images

See also

Tracheotomy

References

External links

 Illustration at nda.ox.ac.uk
  - "Skeleton of the larynx."
 

Human head and neck